In the Line of Fire is the debut solo studio album by American rapper Hussein Fatal. It released on March 24, 1998 via Relativity Records. Recording sessions took place at Platinum Island Studios, The Hit Factory and Chung King Studios in New York, and at Jimmy Weaver Studio. Production was handled by Darrell "Delite" Allamby, Reef, Steve Pitts, Baby Paul, Buff William, D'Anthony Johnson, Femi Ojetunde, Quimmy Quim, and Courtney Burgess, who also served as executive producer together with Awanda Booth. It features guest appearances from Dirty Bert, Antoinette Roberson, Freddie Foxxx, Merciless X, Smooth and Tame One. The album peaked at number 50 on the Billboard 200 and number 10 on the Top R&B/Hip-Hop Albums. Two singles were released: "Getto Star" and "Everyday", with the latter reached number 79 on the Hot R&B/Hip-Hop Songs.

Track listing

Sample credits
Track 5 contains elements from "A Star In The Ghetto" written by Phillip Mitchell and performed by Average White Band.
Track 6 contains elements from "Feel Like Making Love" written by Gene McDaniels.

Personnel

 Bruce "Hussein Fatal" Washington – main artist, sleeve notes
 James "Freddie Foxxx" Campbell – featured artist (track 2)
 Antoinette Roberson – featured artist (track 3)
 Dirty Bert – featured artist (tracks: 4, 8)
 Smooth – featured artist (track 4)
 Jamal "Mac Mall" Rocker – featured artist (track 6)
 Merciless X – featured artist (track 6)
 Rahem "Tame One" Brown – featured artist (track 9)
 Courtney Burgess – producer (track 1), executive producer, sleeve notes
 Buff William – producer (track 1)
 D'Anthony Johnson – producer (track 2)
 Darrell "Delite" Allamby – producer (tracks: 3, 8)
 Muntaquim "Quimmy Quim" Farid – producer (track 4)
 Rob "Reef" Tewlow – producer (tracks: 5, 9)
 Paul "Baby Paul" Hendricks – producer (track 6)
 Steve Pitts – producer (tracks: 7, 10)
 Femi Ojetunde – producer (track 11)
 Carl Nappa – mixing (tracks: 1, 3, 4, 6, 8)
 Troy Hightower – mixing (tracks: 2, 7, 10, 11)
 Ken "Duro" Ifill – mixing (tracks: 5, 9)
 Michael Sarsfield – mastering
 David Bett – creative director
 Awanda Booth – executive producer
 Daniel Hastings – photography

Charts

References

External links

1998 debut albums
Hussein Fatal albums
Relativity Records albums